Zagel or Zägel is a surname. Notable people with the surname include:

Ernst Zägel (1936–2020), German footballer
James Zagel (born 1941), American judge

See also
Sagel